Lakeside Beach State Park is a  state park located on the shore of Lake Ontario in the Town of Carlton, Orleans County, New York.

Park description
The park includes 274 campsites, as well as a campground store. Despite its name, swimming is not allowed at the park. The park installed the 18-hole "Shore Winds Disc Golf Course" in 2009, which starts near the back of the park and includes several holes playing along the Lake Ontario shoreline.

The park may be accessed from Route 18. The park is also the western terminus of the Lake Ontario State Parkway.

See also
 List of New York state parks

References

External links
 New York State Parks: Lakeside Beach State Park

State parks of New York (state)
Parks in Orleans County, New York